Harding is an unincorporated community in Randolph County, in the U.S. state of West Virginia.

History
A post office called Harding was established in 1892, and remained in operation until 1959. The community was named after French Harding, a Confederate war veteran.

References

Unincorporated communities in Randolph County, West Virginia
Unincorporated communities in West Virginia